() is a Japanese singer, composer, pianist, and poet, best known as the leader of Wagakki Band.

Biography 
At the age of three, Yuko Suzuhana began studying classical piano. She began studying Shigin and Kenshibu at the age of five. After graduating from Ibaraki Prefectural Mito Daini Senior High School, Suzuhana studied at the Tokyo College of Music. After working as pianist and lecturer in a piano class, she started singing in the classical pop unit Asty, formed with her classmates at the university.

In 2011, Suzuhana won the grand prize in the Youth Division of the National Ginpo Concours sponsored by Nippon Columbia. In February 2012, Suzuhana co-founded the band Hanafugetsu with shakuhachi player Daisuke Kaminaga and koto player Kiyoshi Ibukuro. A year later, she conceived a band that fused the traditional and modern sides of Japanese culture, leading to the formation of Wagakki Band.

In 2016, Suzuhana released her first solo album Cradle of Eternity. In March 2017, she was appointed Ambassador in the Ibaraki and Mito prefectures. In June 2019, Suzuhana transferred her office and label from Avex Trax to Universal Music Japan. On June 28, 2021, Suzuhana announced the restart of her solo career with the music video "Campanula", which premiered on her YouTube channel on June 30.

Personal life 
On August 21, 2022, Suzuhana revealed that she married Ibukuro on March 4, 2020, and she was pregnant with their first child. She gave birth to a baby girl on November 25.

Discography

Albums

Solo albums

Asty

Yukari

Singles

References

External links
 
 
 
 Yuko Suzuhana at Oricon

Wagakki Band
Japanese women singers
Japanese pianists
Japanese songwriters
Year of birth missing (living people)
Living people
Tokyo College of Music alumni